Neacomys tenuipes, also known as the narrow-footed neacomys or narrow-footed bristly mouse, is found along the northern Andes from northwestern Venezuela through Colombia into Ecuador, in rainforest at elevations from 400 to 1750 m. Populations of small Neacomys in the lowland Amazon basin, previously assigned to this species, are now recognized as belonging to separate species.

References

Musser, G.G. and Carleton, M.D. 2005. Superfamily Muroidea. Pp. 894–1531 in Wilson, D.E. and Reeder, D.M. (eds.). Mammal Species of the World: a taxonomic and geographic reference. 3rd ed. Baltimore: The Johns Hopkins University Press, 2 vols., 2142 pp. 
Ochoa, J., Rivas, B., Gómez-Laverde, M., Woodman, N. and Timm, R. 2008. . In IUCN. IUCN Red List of Threatened Species. Version 2009.2. <www.iucnredlist.org>. Downloaded on December 2, 2009.

Neacomys
Mammals of Colombia
Mammals described in 1900
Taxa named by Oldfield Thomas